Danko Jones is a Canadian hard rock trio from Toronto. The band consists of Danko Jones (vocals/guitar), John 'JC' Calabrese (bass), and Rich Knox (drums). The band's music includes elements of hard rock and punk and they are known for their energetic live shows.

History

Formation and early years 

Formed in 1996 by namesake Danko Jones, Scaltro (John Calabrese) and Gran Sfigato (Michael Caricari). Danko Jones played consistently for two years after formation in and around the northeastern United States and Canada, opening for The New Bomb Turks, Nashville Pussy, Blonde Redhead, The Make-Up, The Dirtbombs, The Chrome Cranks and The Demolition Doll Rods. Originally they did not intend to release an album, preferring to have the band's live reputation spread by word of mouth.

Eventually, the trio relented and put out a self-titled six-song EP on Sonic Unyon records in 1998. In 1999 the band performed around Toronto, including at Lee's Palace and the Horseshoe Tavern. That year they released the self-produced My Love Is Bold E.P. and release the single "Bounce". They were nominated for a Juno Award in 2000 for Best Alternative Album.

In early 2000 Danko Jones opened for Beck at Maple Leaf Gardens. In 2001 Bad Taste Records released a compilation of the band's early recordings, demos, and b-sides entitled, I'm Alive and On Fire. A five-week European tour followed to promote the release including shows at the Roskilde festival in Denmark and Hultsfred festival in Sweden. By the end of the year they had returned twice more, once as main support for the Backyard Babies.

In 2002 they released their first full-length album, Born a Lion, produced by Bill Bell, on Bad Taste Records in Europe and on Universal in Canada. The band did several European tours and two Canadian tours to promote the record including a repeat performance at Roskilde and a return to Hultsfred as well as stops to Pukkelpop in Belgium and The Lowlands festival in the Netherlands. They also performed the opening slot with The Rolling Stones on their "40 Licks" World tour kick-off show at the Palais Royale in Toronto, Ontario, Canada on August 16, 2002.

2003 saw the release of We Sweat Blood, produced by Matt DeMatteo, and the group taking a heavier approach to their hard-rock sound. More touring followed that included Europe and Japan. They were also nominated for two Junos: Best Rock Album (Born a Lion) and Best video ("Lovercall"). While success was happening abroad, home relations with Universal Canada had soured and the band was dropped mid-album run. Explanations from the label were vague, but the separation happened after Jones' February 2004 appearance on CBC Sunday where Jones appeared as a pro-downloader opposite then CRIA president, Brian Robertson. In spite of being dropped from Universal Canada, the group continued to tour heavily for the rest of the year well into 2004 with Turbonegro, Sepultura and The Bronx. While touring they received another Juno nomination for Best Rock Album (We Sweat Blood) and tour Australia as well as more European dates including Rock Am Ring and Rock Im Park in Germany and Download, Leeds and Reading in England.

Mid 2000s 
Early 2005 recording sessions for the follow-up to We Sweat Blood were interspersed with a series of tours amidst recording that brought the band to the Netherlands, Germany and South Africa-promoted by their record label and events company ASP Records, who released a collectors double set featuring Born A Lion and We Sweat Blood. In April, American label, Razor & Tie released We Sweat Blood and the band set out to America in support as well. Working two releases simultaneously on both sides of the Atlantic proved time-consuming, and the worldwide release for the upcoming album, Sleep Is The Enemy, produced by Matt DeMatteo, was pushed back to 2006.

 In 2005, Danko Jones signed to Aquarius Records. During the summer and fall of 2005, the band toured America heavily with two of We Sweat Bloods singles being played regularly on rock radio in America ("Lovercall" and "Forget My Name"). Stateside tours with Flogging Molly, Our Lady Peace, The Supersuckers, and The (International) Noise Conspiracy followed. Prior to the release of Sleep Is The Enemy drummer Damon Richardson left the band, citing fatigue. He was replaced by Dan Cornelius.

In January and February 2006, the band set out to do their first Canadian tour in almost four years, opening for Nickelback. With the release of Sleep Is the Enemy came more touring including America and a headlining European club tour with support from Brant Bjork & The Bros.

Their fourth album, Never Too Loud was released on February 27, 2008 and produced by Nick Raskulinecz. The album yielded three singles, the international hit, "Code Of The Road", followed by "Take Me Home" and "King Of Magazines". A city tour of Europe in April 2008 was followed by a Canadian tour in May and a three-month stint in Europe playing about 30 dates on the festival circuit that included Rock Am Ring, Rock Im Park and With Full Force in Germany; Bospop and Lowlands in The Netherlands; Sziget Festival in Hungary; Rabarock in Estonia; Provinssi Rock in Finland; and Eurockeennes and Hellfest in France, where Jones sang on stage with Death Angel for the song, "Bored".  They opened for Motörhead in England, Germany, France and Benelux in late 2008.

On February 3, 2009 B-Sides was released in Europe only—a collection of previously released B-sides from European singles and unreleased tracks that spanned 1996 to 2008. On February 24 they set out on a seven-week tour in support of the release that spanned The Netherlands, Denmark, Sweden, Norway, Finland, Germany, Austria, Switzerland, Belgium, France and the UK with support coming from The Backyard Babies, Winnebego Deal and The Black Spiders. The CD yielded the singles "Sugar High" and "My Problems (Are Your Problems Now)". A greatest hits compilation titled This Is Danko Jones was released on April 7 the same year in Canada only.

In the summer the band made a few festival appearances, including the Sziget Festival in Hungary on the main stage with Faith No More and The Offspring, as well as Huntenpop in The Netherlands, Winterthur and Gampel Open Air in Switzerland, Parken Festival in Norway and Jurassic Rock in Finland. In January and February 2010 the band toured across Canada with Guns N' Roses and Sebastian Bach. In March the same year they toured the United States with Clutch.

2010s 

Their fifth album Below the Belt was released on May 11, 2010 and produced by Matt DeMatteo. The album's first single, "Full of Regret", features Elijah Wood, Lemmy Kilmister, Selma Blair and Mike Watt in the accompanying video, the first in 'The Ballad of Danko Jones' video trilogy. It debuted at No. 36 on Billboard Mainstream Rock Tracks in November. It is also featured on EA's NHL 11 soundtrack. The second single, "Had Enough", has Ralph Macchio appearing in the accompanying video while "I Think Bad Thoughts" features Wood, Macchio, Jena Malone and Watt in the final instalment of the music video trilogy.

In June 2011 drummer Dan Cornelius left the band and was replaced by Atom Willard. A 90-minute documentary about the band, Bring on the Mountain, was released in June 2012. The two-disc DVD also included a short film based on the band's latest three videos, all their music videos and several live clips. An oral history book about the band, Too Much Trouble: A Very Oral History of Danko Jones, was to be released by ECW Press in October 2012. Rock and Roll Is Black and Blue was released on September 21, 2012 in Europe and October 9 in North America. They went on a 2013 Spring tour with Volbeat and Spoken.

Fire Music, the band's first album to include drummer Rich Knox, was released on February 10, 2015 in Canada. In July 2015, the band announced a nine-date tour of the UK and Ireland scheduled for September, with support from the Amorettes. More touring followed, including a tour of summer festivals.

Danko Jones' eighth album, Wild Cat, was released on March 3, 2017. The band also went on a 17-date European tour to accompany the release of the album. 2017 saw four more tours: a spring Canadian tour, the usual summer festival tour, an autumn Canadian tour and a winter Nordic tour. Danko Jones supported Skindred on their April UK tour, alongside CKY. The band performed in Luxembourg in May that year. "We're Crazy", was released on September 21, 2018, although it's been played live since April. A Rock Supreme, their ninth studio album, was released on April 26, 2019. A European summer festival tour with Volbeat and Baroness followed. In March 2021 the band released "I Want Out", the first single and video from their tenth album, Power Trio, scheduled for an August 2021 release.

Members
This list is composed of band members who have played live with the band for a substantial period, and does not include guest performances and one-off substitutes.

Current
 Danko Jones – lead vocals, guitar (1996–present)
 John Calabrese (formerly Scaltro) – bass (1996–present)
 Rich Knox – drums (2013–present)

Former

 Michael Caricari (formerly Gran Sfigato) – drums (1996–1999)
 Gavin Brown – drums (1999)
 Niko Quintal – drums (1999)
 Damon Richardson – drums (2000–2005)
 Dan Cornelius – drums (2006–2011)
 Atom Willard – drums (2011–2013)

Timeline

Discography

I'm Alive and on Fire (2001)
Born a Lion (2002)
We Sweat Blood (2003) 
Sleep Is the Enemy (2006)
Never Too Loud (2008)
B-Sides (2009)
Below the Belt (2010)
Rock and Roll Is Black and Blue (2012)
Fire Music (2015)
Wild Cat (2017)
A Rock Supreme (2019)
Power Trio (2021)

Honours
Juno Award
2004 Nominated, Best Rock Album (We Sweat Blood)
2003 Nominated, Best Video ("Lovercall")
2003 Nominated, Best Rock Album (Born a Lion)
2000 Nominated, Best Alternative Album (My Love Is Bold)

See also

Canadian rock
List of bands from Canada

References

External links

Musical groups established in 1996
Canadian indie rock groups
Canadian hard rock musical groups
Musical groups from Toronto
Canadian musical trios
1996 establishments in Ontario
Sonic Unyon artists